is a 2004 Taiga drama historical fiction television series produced by Japanese broadcaster NHK. It was a popular drama about the Shinsengumi, a Japanese special police force from the Bakumatsu period.

Actors include Koji Yamamoto, Tatsuya Fujiwara, Joe Odagiri, and Shingo Katori of the pop idol group SMAP. It was written by Japanese director and playwright, Kōki Mitani.

Staff
 Original: Kōki Mitani
 Music: Takayuki Hattori
 Titling: Tansetsu Ogino
 Narrator: Yasuo Kodera
 Historical research: Manabu Ōishi, Tatsuya Yamamura
 Architectural research: Sei Hirai
 Clothing research: Kiyoko Koizumi
 Production coordinator: Kōji Kikkawa
 Casting: Kazuhiko Itō
 Sword fight arranger : Kunishirō Hayashi

Cast
Shinsengumi
Shingo Katori as Kondō Isami
Kōji Yamamoto as Hijikata Toshizō
Tatsuya Fujiwara as Okita Sōji
Joe Odagiri as Saitō Hajime
Nakamura Kantarō II as Tōdō Heisuke
Tarō Yamamoto as Harada Sanosuke
Masato Sakai as Yamanami Keisuke
Tomomitsu Yamaguchi as Nagakura Shinpachi
 Takashi Kobayashi as Inoue Genzaburō
 Shoei as Shimada Kai
 Jun Hashimoto as Yamazaki Susumu
 Koji Ohkura as Kawai Kisaburo
 Norito Yashima as Takeda Kanryuusai

Seichū-rōshi gumi
Kōichi Satō as Serizawa Kamo
Kazuyuki Aijima as Niimi Nishiki
Tadashi Sakata as Hirayama Gorō
Gōshū as Hirama Jūsuke

Itō-dōjō party
Shōsuke Tanihara as Itō Kashitarō
Masato Obara as Kanō Washio

Aizu Domain
Michitaka Tsutsui as Matsudaira Katamori
Kenichi Yajima as Hirosawa Tomijirō
Yasuyoshi Hara as Teshirogi Suguemon

Tosa Domain
Yōsuke Eguchi as Sakamoto Ryōma
Hiroki Miyake as Mochizuki Kameyata
Nozomu Masuzawa as Nakaoka Shintarō

Chōshū Domain
Ken Ishiguro as Kido Takayoshi
Hiroyuki Ikeuchi as Kusaka Genzui

Satsuma Domain
Takashi Ukaji as Saigō Takamori
Yamato Yasumura as Ōkubo Toshimichi
Takato Gohō as Kuroda Ryōsuke

Tokugawa shogunate
Tomohiko Imai as Tokugawa Yoshinobu – the last shogun
Tsuyoshi Ihara as Sasaki Tadasaburō
Hideki Noda as Katsu Kaishū
Isao Sasaki as Uchiyama Hikojirō
Tsuyoshi Kusanagi as Enomoto Takeaki
Tetsushi Tanaka as Matsumoto Ryōjun

Imperial House
Nakamura Fukusuke IX as Emperor Kōmei – the 121st emperor
Yūji Nakamura as Iwakura Tomomi

Others
Yasuko Sawaguchi as Okita Mitsu - Okita Sōji's eldest sister
Kōji Ishizaka as Sakuma Shōzan
Tetsurō Sagawa as Onogawa Hidegorō
Mainoumi Shūhei as Kumakawa Kuwajirō – a sumo wrestler
Daishi Nobuyuki as Kurogami – a sumo wrestler
Jay Kabira as Henry Heusken
Marty Kuehnert as Townsend Harris
Yūka as Okō
Asahi Kurizuka as Hijikata Tamejirō, Toshizō's older brother
Rei Kikukawa as Ikumatsu

References

External links
 
 SHINSENGUMI 新選組 Shinsengumi Website

2004 Japanese television series debuts
2004 Japanese television series endings
Taiga drama
Television shows written by Kôki Mitani
Cultural depictions of Tokugawa Yoshinobu